The Philip Lynott Album is the second and final solo album by Irish rock singer Philip Lynott, released in 1982.

Not included on the album was the B-side to the "Together" single, "Somebody Else's Dream" and the B-side to the "Old Town" single, "Beat of the Drum".  Both later appeared on the Yellow Pearl Lynott solo compilation album in 2010. "Somebody Else's Dream" was performed live on The Old Grey Whistle Test to promote the album.

Track listing
All tracks composed by Philip Lynott, except where noted

Side one
 "Fatalistic Attitude" – 4:31
 "The Man's a Fool" – 2:58
 "Old Town" (Lynott, Jimmy Bain) – 3:27
 "Cathleen" – 3:34
 "Growing Up" – 5:00
 "Yellow Pearl" (Lynott, Midge Ure) – 2:58

Side two
"Together" – 3:39
 "Little Bit of Water" – 3:35
 "Ode to Liberty (The Protest Song)" (Lynott, Bain) – 5:48
 "Gino" – 4:10
 "Don't Talk About Me Baby" – 4:30

Singles
 "Together" / "Somebody Else's Dream" – 7" (1982)
 "Together" (Dance Mix) / "Together" / "Somebody Else's Dream" – 12" (1982)
 "Old Town" / "Beat of the Drum" – 7" (1982)
 "Nineteen" / "Nineteen" (Dub Mix) – 7" (1982)
 "Nineteen" / "Nineteen" (Dub Mix) / Whiskey in the Jar (live) – 7" double pack (1982)
 "Nineteen" / "Nineteen" (Dub Mix) / A Night in the Life of a Blues Singer – 12" (1982)

Personnel
Philip Lynott – vocals, bass guitar, bass synthesiser, timpani & cymbal, CR 76 computer drum machines, guitar, Sarah's space gun, Irish harp, keyboards, percussion, Producer
Midge Ure – guitar, keyboards, Linn drum machine (tracks 6, 7), producer (track 7)
Mark Knopfler – lead guitar (track 9)
Jimmy Bain – bass guitar, backing vocals (tracks 2, 3)
Jerome Rimson – bass guitar (tracks 7, 10)
Scott Gorham – bass guitar (track 8)
Fiachra Trench – string and brass arrangements
Darren Wharton – keyboards, drum machine (tracks 1-9, 11)
Huey Lewis – harmonica (track 4)
Mel Collins – saxophone (track 5)
Rusty Egan – drums (tracks 2–4)
Bobby C. Benberg – drums (track 8)
Brian Downey – drums (track 9)
Mark Nauseef – drums, percussion, vocal intro (track 10)
Pierre Moerlen – drums (track 11)
Gordon Johnson – intro voice (track 3)
Suzanne Machon – intro voice (track 4)
Monica Lynott – backing vocals (tracks 4, 5)

Production
Kit Woolven – producer, engineer
Mark Knopfler, Neil Dorfsman – mixing on track 9

Charts

Album

Singles

References

1982 albums
Phil Lynott albums
Albums produced by Midge Ure
Vertigo Records albums
Warner Records albums